Punarwas is a Municipality in Kanchanpur District in Sudurpashchim Province of south-western Nepal. The new Municipality was established on 18 May 2014 by merging the existing 3 Village Development Committees i.e. Parasan, Tribhuwanbasti and Kalika. At the time of the 2011 Nepal census, it had a population of 43,996 people living in Punarwas.

References

Populated places in Kanchanpur District
Nepal municipalities established in 2014
Municipalities in Kanchanpur District